Strontium peroxide is an inorganic compound with the formula SrO2 that exists in both anhydrous and octahydrate form, both of which are white solids.  The anhydrous form adopts a structure similar to that of calcium carbide.

Uses
It is an oxidizing agent used for bleaching. It is used in some pyrotechnic compositions as an oxidizer and a vivid red pyrotechnic colorant.  It can also be used as an antiseptic and in tracer munitions.

Production
Strontium peroxide is produced by passing oxygen over heated strontium oxide.  Upon heating in the absence of O2, it degrades to SrO and O2.  It is more thermally labile than BaO2.

References

See also
 Barium peroxide
 Strontium oxide

Strontium compounds
Peroxides
Pyrotechnic oxidizers
Pyrotechnic colorants
Antiseptics
Oxidizing agents